Ciambra may refer to:

 A Ciambra, a 2017 Italian drama film
 Ciambra, a brand name of the drug pemetrexed